Saviano is a comune (municipality) in the Metropolitan City of Naples  in the Italian region Campania, located about 25 km northeast of Naples. As of 31 December 2004, it had a population of 15,114 and an area of 13.8 km2.

Geography
Saviano borders the following municipalities: Nola, San Vitaliano, Scisciano, Somma Vesuviana.

History
The comune was created in 1867 through the merger of the former Sirico (thenceforth called Saviano) with Sant'Erasmo. It was part of the Terra di Lavoro province until 1927.

Demographic evolution

References